Beyond Forty is a Canadian drama film, directed by Anne Claire Poirier and released in 1982. The film centres on a group of childhood friends reuniting as adults in their 40s, and has been compared by critics to the 1983 film The Big Chill.

The film's cast includes Monique Mercure, Louise Rémy, Pierre Thériault, Aubert Pallascio, Luce Guilbeault, Michelle Rossignol, Patricia Nolin and Jacques Godin.

The film received three Genie Award nominations at the 4th Genie Awards in 1983: Best Actress (Mercure), Best Supporting Actress (Nolin) and Best Costume Design (Huguette Gagné).

References

External links

1982 films
Canadian drama films
Films directed by Anne Claire Poirier
National Film Board of Canada films
1982 drama films
French-language Canadian films
1980s Canadian films